The 41st Infantry Division, formerly the 41st Fortress Division, was a German Army infantry division in World War II. It was employed on occupation duties in southern Greece, and surrendered to the Yugoslav partisans at the end of the war.

History 
Founded as the 41st Fortress Division, this unit was formed in Bruck an der Mur in December 1943, with its command staff being formed from the cadre of the defunct 39th Infantry Division, and was ready for duty at the start of 1944 at a strength of 22 battalions. In its initial deployment, it was to defend the Peloponnese peninsula of Greece as a coastal component of LXVIII Army Corps, attached to the Army Group F under General Hellmuth Felmy.

The 733rd Grenadier Regiment was attached to the division in September 1944, after it was separated from its parent 133rd Fortress Division during the evacuation of Crete. On the 28th it was located in Thebes, though this was only learned by Allied decrypters the following month. It operated in the army group's rear guard during the German retreat from Corinth, being attacked by royalist guerrillas and elements of the British 2nd Parachute Brigade, with minor skirmishes taking place as the division moved through Yugoslavia.

The division was restructured as an infantry division in January 1945, and engaged the Soviet Army as such along the Sava and Drava rivers. The 41st was then put under the command of the 117th Jäger Division. The 41st surrendered to the 11th Yugoslav Shock Division near Zagreb on May 8, 1945.

Commanders

Order of battle
In its initial formation, the division was two full regiments in strength. It was expanded further in 1944, and even more in 1945.

September 1944
141st Divisional Supply Troops
141st Engineer Battalion
141st Fusilier Battalion
141st Signal Battalion
309th Army Anti-Aircraft Battalion
733rd Grenadier Regiment
919th Army Coastal Artillery Regiment
938th Grenadier Regiment
965th Grenadier Regiment
1009th Fortress Infantry Battalion

1945
1230th Grenadier Regiment
1231st Grenadier Regiment
1232nd Grenadier Regiment
41st Füsilier-Bataillon
141st Artillery Regiment
141st Pioneer Bataillon
141st Panzerjäger-Abteilung
141st Nachrichten-Abteilung
141st Feldersatz-Bataillon
141st Versorgungseinheiten

Sources

Notes

Military units and formations established in 1945
Military units and formations disestablished in 1945
0*041